Aughnacloy is a townland of 115 acres in County Tyrone, Northern Ireland. It is situated in the civil parish of Annaclone and the historic barony of Iveagh Upper, Upper Half.

References

Civil parish of Annaclone